Maximum Money Monster is a 1990 album by Zeni Geva. It is a re-release of their 1989 album Maximum Love and Fuck, with additional songs.  The Pathological CD release had the whole album as one track. In 2007, it was reissued by Cold Spring with three bonus previously unreleased recordings from a 1990 show at Antiknock in Tokyo, and all songs as separate tracks.

Reception
Though not reviewed by many publications, the album has received some praise among critics. Likening the band to noise rock and industrial music, the album was compared to groups stylistically such as Swans and Godflesh and it was noted that the "metal riffage...is stripped of excess" in a review written for Compulsion Online. Writing for Chain D.L.K., Maurizio Pustianaz similarly noted hardcore punk, industrial, and free jazz influences.

Track listing

Credits 
 KK Null - vocals, guitars, engineering
 Mara Tabata - guitars
 Tatsuya Yoshida - drums (tracks 2, 3, 4, and 8), vocals (tracks 2 and 8)
 Ikuo Taketani - drums (tracks 1, 5, 6, and 7), artwork (original release)
 Takashi Iwamoto - engineering
 Yuki Torumi - artwork (original release)
 Abby Helasdottir - artwork (reissue)

References

1990 albums
Zeni Geva albums
Cold Spring (label) albums